Priest Lauderdale (born August 31, 1973) is an American-Bulgarian former professional basketball player.

College career
Lauderdale attended high school at Carver Military Academy, in Chicago, Illinois. After high school, Lauderdale played college basketball at Central State University, in Wilberforce, Ohio, where he played with the Central State Marauders (1993–1994). Lauderdale also attended Kaskaskia College, in Centralia, Illinois, but he did not play competitive basketball while he was there.

Professional career
After college, Lauderdale, a 7'4" (2.24 m) tall, 330 lbs. (150 kgs), center, played professionally in the Greek Basket League. He played with Peristeri Athens, during the 1995–96 season. He also played in the Greek League All-Star Game that season. 

Lauderdale was selected in the first round, with the 28th overall pick of the 1996 NBA Draft, by the Atlanta Hawks. Lauderdale saw action in 35 NBA regular season games played with the Atlanta Hawks, in the 1996–97 season. He averaged 3.2 points, as well as 1.2 rebounds per contest, and he also played in three playoff games for Atlanta that season. He concluded his brief NBA career with the Denver Nuggets, in the 1997–98 season, in which he averaged 3.7 points and 2.6 rebounds per game, in 39 games played for the team. Lauderdale also played with the Fort Wayne Fury, in the Continental Basketball Association, and with the Connecticut Pride, in the International Basketball League, during the 2000-01 season. 

Lauderdale played professionally with the Bulgarian Basketball League club Lukoil Academic, from 2002 to 2005. While he was a member of the club, he received Bulgarian citizenship.

During his pro club career, Lauderdale also played in numerous other countries besides Greece and Bulgaria, including: Venezuela, Cyprus, Saudi Arabia, Iran, the United Arab Emirates, China, Iraq, Lebanon, and the United Kingdom.

Coaching career
Lauderdale has worked as a basketball coach at youth camps in Germany.

See also
List of tallest players in National Basketball Association history

References

External links
NBA.com Player Profile
EuroCup Profile
FIBA Europe Profile
College & NBA Stats @ Databasebasketball.com
Basketball-Reference.com File
Eurobasket.com Profile
Coach Priest Lauderdale

1973 births
Living people
20th-century African-American sportspeople
21st-century African-American sportspeople
African-American basketball players
American emigrants to Bulgaria
American expatriate basketball people in China
American expatriate basketball people in Cyprus
American expatriate basketball people in Greece
American expatriate basketball people in Iran
American expatriate basketball people in Saudi Arabia
American expatriate basketball people in the United Arab Emirates
American expatriate basketball people in Venezuela
American men's basketball players
Apollon Limassol BC players
Atlanta Hawks draft picks
Atlanta Hawks players
Basketball players from Chicago
BC Levski Sofia players
Bulgarian men's basketball players
Bulgarian people of American descent
Centers (basketball)
Central State Marauders basketball players
Denver Nuggets players
Fort Wayne Fury players
Gaiteros del Zulia players
Mahram Tehran BC players
Naturalised citizens of Bulgaria
Peristeri B.C. players
PBC Academic players
People with gigantism
Shandong Hi-Speed Kirin players